"I Walk Alone" is the first single from the album My Winter Storm by Finnish vocalist Tarja. The single was released on October 26, 2007 through Universal Music label.

Song
This song was written by Harry Sommerdahl, Mattias Lindblom and Anders Wollbeck. It was inspired by a musical motif in Requiem by Mozart. It features a theater atmosphere accompanied by orchestra, guitars, and Turunen's powerful voice.

According to Turunen the song "describes her personality perfectly well and identifies her as a singer".

Some fans have considered this as her response to Nightwish's "Bye Bye Beautiful" from the album Dark Passion Play (2007), which was a song directed towards her. The song was a declaration of her independence and willingness to move on.

In 2009, the song was covered by the Norwegian singer Jørn Lande on his album Spirit Black.

Video
The video was shot at Teufelssee in Berlin, Germany. It was directed by Jörn Heitmann (who had already worked with Turunen directing Nightwish's Sleeping Sun 2005 video). It also features four characters interpreted by Turunen herself. They are: the Phoenix, the Dead Boy, the Doll and the Ice Queen.

Charts

Track listing
The single features 3 different configurations:

References

Songs about loneliness
2007 singles
Songs written by Anders Wollbeck
Songs written by Mattias Lindblom
Tarja Turunen songs
Songs written by Harry Sommerdahl
2007 songs
Universal Music Group singles